Rangiriri was a rural New Zealand parliamentary electorate in the Auckland Region from 1978 to 1984.

Population centres
The 1977 electoral redistribution was the most overtly political since the Representation Commission had been established through an amendment to the Representation Act in 1886, initiated by Muldoon's National Government. As part of the 1976 census, a large number of people failed to fill out an electoral re-registration card, and census staff had not been given the authority to insist on the card being completed. This had little practical effect for people on the general roll, but it transferred Māori to the general roll if the card was not handed in. Together with a northward shift of New Zealand's population, this resulted in five new electorates having to be created in the upper part of the North Island. The electoral redistribution was very disruptive, and 22 electorates were abolished, while 27 electorates were newly created (including Rangiriri) or re-established.

Population centres for those six years included Pukekohe, Meremere, Huntly, and Ngāruawāhia.

History
When Rangiriri was abolished for the 1984 election, Birch transferred back to the Franklin electorate.

Member of Parliament
Key

Election results

1981 election

1978 election

Notes

References

Historical electorates of New Zealand
Politics of the Auckland Region
1984 disestablishments in New Zealand
1978 establishments in New Zealand